The 2018–19 Melbourne Victory FC season was the club's 14th season since its establishment in 2004. The club participated in the A-League for the 14th time and the AFC Champions League for the seventh time.

Players

Squad information

Transfers

Transfers in

Transfers out

From youth squad

Contract extensions

Technical staff

Squad statistics

Appearances and goals

|-
|colspan="14"|Players no longer at the club

† = Scholarship or NPL/NYL-listed player

Pre-season and friendlies

Competitions

Overall

A-League

League table

Results summary

Results by round

Matches

Finals series

FFA Cup

AFC Champions League

Group stage

References

External links
 Official Website

2018–19 A-League season by team
Melbourne Victory FC seasons